Songs from the Black Hole is an unfinished album by American rock band Weezer recorded between 1994 and 1996. Intended to follow Weezer's 1994 self-titled debut album, it was to be a rock opera that expressed songwriter Rivers Cuomo's mixed feelings about rock-and-roll success. Its characters were to be voiced by members of Weezer, plus guest vocalists Rachel Haden (of That Dog and the Rentals) and Joan Wasser (of the Dambuilders).

Cuomo recorded demos for Songs from the Black Hole over Christmas 1994, and Weezer held recording sessions over the following year. In late 1995, Cuomo enrolled at Harvard University, where his songwriting became darker and more confessional. The Black Hole concept was abandoned, and Weezer's second album became Pinkerton (1996), including some songs once intended for Songs from the Black Hole.

Two tracks, "I Just Threw Out the Love of My Dreams" and "Devotion", were released as Pinkerton B-sides. Demos, lyrics and sheet music were released on Cuomo's compilations Alone (2007), Alone II (2008), and Alone III (2011), and on the 2010 Pinkerton reissue. The songs received positive reviews, and Rolling Stone described Songs from the Black Hole as a "lost mythical masterpiece".

Background

Weezer's self-titled debut album was released in May 1994. It was certified platinum in January 1995 for sales of over one million. Songwriter Rivers Cuomo said the success "stirred up a lot of mixed feelings in me – 'Yay, I'm happy' as well as 'I'm not sure this is the life I want to lead'." He developed an inferiority complex about rock music, feeling his songs were "simplistic and silly", and wanted to write "complex, intense, beautiful" music instead.

Touring with Weezer, Cuomo listened to the operas Aida (1871) and Madama Butterfly (1904), the rock opera Jesus Christ Superstar (1970), and the musical Les Misérables (1980). Inspired by how these works married music and narrative, he decided to write a rock opera to explore his feelings about relationships, fame, and life as a touring musician.

Concept
Songs From the Black Hole was to be a science-fiction rock opera with tracks that segued seamlessly, ending with a coda that revisited the album's major musical themes. The characters were to be voiced by Cuomo, guitarist Brian Bell, bassist Matt Sharp, and Weezer collaborator Karl Koch, along with guest vocalists Rachel Haden of That Dog and the Rentals, and Joan Wasser of the Dambuilders.

In 2126, the spaceship Betsy II embarks on a galaxy-wide mission. Crew members Wuan (Bell) and Dondó (Sharp) are in high spirits, but the ship's captain, Jonas (Cuomo), has mixed feelings. The ship's robot, M1 (Koch), urges the crew to stay focused on their objective. Jonas becomes involved in a love triangle with "good girl" Laurel (Haden), and the ship's cook, "bad girl" Maria (Wasser), with whom he fathers a child. When the Betsy II reaches its destination, Jonas is disillusioned and longs to return to a simpler life.

Cuomo conceived the story as a metaphor for his conflicted feelings about touring in a successful rock band. The ship's name Betsy II is taken from Weezer's first tour bus, nicknamed Betsy; M1 represents Weezer's management and record label; Wuan and Dondó represent the part of Cuomo that was excited about success; Jonas represents his doubts and longing; Laurel and Maria represent his relationships with women.

Recording and abandonment 

Cuomo recorded demos for Songs from the Black Hole on an 8-track recorder at his family home in Connecticut over Christmas 1994. Most of the songs already existed and were rewritten to fit the Songs for the Black Hole concept. Cuomo performed every part himself, pitch-shifting his voice for the female characters. To add a science fiction element to Weezer's sound, he used synthesizers including an Electrocomp 101 he had recently purchased from a pawn shop in rural Connecticut. By February, he had completed an initial track list.

While Weezer was on tour in Europe later that month, Sharp returned to America due to a family emergency, leaving the band stranded in Hamburg for a week. Cuomo and drummer Patrick Wilson rented a studio and recorded additional demos, including a version of "Blast Off!" using a vocoder for the robot character of M1.

In March 1995, Cuomo, who was born with one leg shorter than the other, had extensive surgery to lengthen his leg followed by months of painful physiotherapy. This affected his songwriting, as he would spend long periods hospitalized under the influence of painkillers. According to Cuomo, around this time the rock opera concept "started to feel too whimsical for where I was emotionally, going through the pain of the procedure ... I went to a more serious and dark place."

Recording began in August 1995 in New York City's Electric Lady Studios, where Weezer had recorded their debut album, but the sessions were not productive. Further sessions were held in September and October, and Weezer recorded versions of "Blast Off!", "Longtime Sunshine", "I Just Threw Out the Love of My Dreams", "Tired of Sex" and "Getchoo". Weezer had not yet abandoned Songs from the Black Hole, but the songs were recorded, according to Koch, with "no story, no theatrics, no characters".

At the end of 1995, wanting to "escape the limelight", Cuomo enrolled at Harvard University to study classical composition. Still recovering from surgery, Cuomo became isolated and his songwriting became darker. Koch described it as "more visceral and exposed, less playful". In January 1996, Weezer restarted recording in Los Angeles at Sound City Studios with new material. The Songs from the Black Hole tracks "Superfriend", "She's Had a Girl" and "Dude, We're Finally Landing" were recorded, but shelved.

By May 1996, Cuomo had settled on a new direction for Weezer's second album, expressing his loneliness and frustration at Harvard, and Songs from the Black Hole was abandoned. The decision was influenced by that year's release of Return of the Rentals, the debut album by Sharp's band the Rentals, as Cuomo felt it shared many musical and lyrical themes.

Weezer's second album became Pinkerton, released on September 24, 1996. It includes "Tired of Sex", "Getchoo" and "No Other One": songs written before Songs from the Black Hole was conceived, rewritten to fit the Black Hole concept, and finally rewritten again for Pinkerton. In June 1996, Weezer recorded the Songs from the Black Hole tracks  "I Just Threw Out the Love of My Dreams" (with Haden on vocals) and "Devotion" and as B-sides for the Pinkerton singles "The Good Life" and "El Scorcho".

Demo releases 
In 1998, Cuomo discussed releasing a compilation of his demos with Weezer's record label Geffen Records, including Songs from the Black Hole tracks, but the label feared it would "dilute" the Weezer brand. Fans petitioned to have Songs from the Black Hole released. In 2007, after further negotiation with Geffen, Cuomo released Alone: The Home Recordings of Rivers Cuomo, a compilation of his demos recorded from 1992 to 2007. It includes five Songs From the Black Hole demos: "Longtime Sunshine", "Blast Off!", "Who You Callin' Bitch?", "Dude, We're Finally Landing", and "Superfriend". It was followed in 2008 by Alone II, which includes "Oh Jonas", "Please Remember" and "Come to My Pod".

In 2010, Geffen released a "deluxe" reissue of Pinkerton, including Cuomo's demo of "You Won't Get With Me Tonight" and a version of "Longtime Sunshine" recorded at Electric Lady Studios in August 1995. In 2011, Cuomo released Alone III: The Pinkerton Years, including a "Suite from the Black Hole" comprising "Oh No, This Is Not For Me", "Tired of Sex", "She's Had a Girl", "What is This I Find?", "Now I Finally See" and "Longtime Sunshine". Alone III was sold exclusively with a book, The Pinkerton Diaries, which collects Cuomo's writing from the era, including Songs from the Black Hole lyrics and sheet music.

Reviewing Alone, Pitchfork critic Jason Crock felt that the Songs from the Black Hole demo "Blast Off!" was the "crown jewel", writing: "It is such a fleeting rush of distortion-driven joy that the edges of the supposed dialogue are entirely blurred, and are hardly essential to enjoy it." He described it as "at least" on par with the "stellar" Pinkerton B-sides once intended for Songs from the Black Hole. Reviewing Alone II, Crock wrote that its Songs from the Black Hole demos were "goofy, off-the-cuff, and charming".

Legacy

In 2007, Rolling Stone included Songs from the Black Hole on its list of rock music's lost "mythical masterpieces". Complex included it on its 2012 list of "50 unreleased albums we'd kill to hear", writing that most of Weezer's best material came from the era. In 2014, the NME included it on its list of "25 unreleased albums we'd really love to hear", but wrote that Pinkerton was "not exactly the worst second prize". Vice wrote that Songs from the Black Hole "deserves to be ahead of most records in every Weezer fan's collection", declaring it better than most of Weezer's output since. In 2017, Stereogum writer Pranav Trewn speculated about how Weezer releasing Songs from the Black Hole instead of Pinkerton might have influenced music: "It’s perhaps the greatest 'what if?' in modern music ... What rock looks like both on the radio and in the underground would be enormously different if not for the varying shades [Weezer] popularized."

Track lists
Cuomo compiled two Songs from the Black Hole track lists: the first in February 1995 and the other in fall 1995.

Track list 1

Track list 2

References 

 Sources

 

 Further reading

External links
Songs from the Black Hole on Weezerpedia

Weezer albums
Albums recorded at Electric Lady Studios
Unreleased albums
Unfinished albums
Science fiction concept albums
Rock operas